Daniel Adejo (born 7 August 1989) is a Nigerian professional footballer who plays as a defender for Greek Super League club Lamia.

Career
Adejo made his Serie A debut on 1 March 2009 in a match against Fiorentina.

On 17 June 2014 Adejo signed a two-year deal with Kalloni. He was released after a season and went on trial with St Johnstone in Scotland, before cutting the trial short after interest from Serie B side Vicenza.

Career statistics

Club

References

External links
Profile at La Gazzetta 2008–09

1989 births
Living people
Nigerian footballers
Nigeria under-20 international footballers
Nigerian expatriate footballers
Nigerian expatriate sportspeople in Italy
Nigerian expatriate sportspeople in Greece
Reggina 1914 players
L.R. Vicenza players
U.S. Salernitana 1919 players
PAE Kerkyra players
AEL Kalloni F.C. players
PAS Lamia 1964 players
Serie A players
Serie B players
Super League Greece players
Expatriate footballers in Italy
Expatriate footballers in Greece
Association football defenders